Deering Island is a small island in Vancouver, British Columbia, located in the North Arm of the Fraser River. It is mostly residential and is connected to the rest of Vancouver by the Deering Island Bridge. Residential development on the island, mainly consisting of luxury homes, began in 1988 and continued into the 1990s. The island was previously a shipyard owned by B.C. Packers. The island is also home to a city park, Deering Island Park.

References

Islands of British Columbia
Landforms of Vancouver